Brian Thomas Kelly is a retired lieutenant general in the United States Air Force. He served as the Deputy Chief of Staff for Manpower, Personnel and Services (A1), a position he held from September 2018 to May 2022. Kelly was commissioned through the ROTC program at University of Notre Dame in 1988.

Raised in Piscataway, New Jersey, Kelly earned a Bachelor of Science degree in aerospace engineering. He later received a master's degree in Military Operational Art and Science from the Air Command and Staff College in 2001 and a Master of Science degree in National Resource Strategy from the Industrial College of the Armed Forces at the National Defense University in 2006.

Effective dates of promotions

References

1960s births
Year of birth uncertain
Living people
People from Piscataway, New Jersey
University of Notre Dame alumni
Air Command and Staff College alumni
National Defense University alumni
United States Air Force generals
Military personnel from New Jersey